Ilam may refer to:

 Ilam District, Province No. 1, Nepal
 Ilam Municipality, in the Ilam District, Nepal
 Ilam Province, Region 4, Iran
 Ilam County, Ilam Province
 Ilam, Iran, capital city of Ilam Province and Ilam County
 Ilam Airport, serving the city
 Ilam University Farm, a village in Mehran County, Ilam Province
 Ilam, New Zealand, a suburb of Christchurch
Ilam (New Zealand electorate), a parliamentary electorate 
Ilam School of Fine Arts, University of Canterbury, Ilam  
 Ilam, Staffordshire, a village in England
 Ilam Park, a National Trust property in Ilam, Staffordshire
 Ilam or Eelam, Tamil name for Sri Lanka
 Independent Lawyers' Association of Myanmar
 Instituto Latinoamericano de Museos, web portal about Latin American museums and parks
 International Library of African Music, based in South Africa

See also
 Elam (disambiguation)